Xenolechia ceanothiae is a moth of the family Gelechiidae. It is found in North America, where it has been recorded from Michigan.

The length of the forewings is 4.5−6 mm. The forewings are dark brownish grey with a suffused white band, a suffused white costal spot and a suffused white spot on the tornus, as well as six black scale tufts. The hindwings are pale grey.

The larvae feed on Ceanothus americanus and Ceanothus herbaceus. They mine the leaves of their host plant. The mine is full-depth and starts at the leaf apex. The larvae have a pale grey body and reddish brown head. There seems to be one generation per year with larvae present mid-September to late October.

References

Moths described in 2014
Xenolechia